Mount Cain is a mountain on Vancouver Island, British Columbia, Canada, located  east of Woss and 2 km north of Mount Abel. The mountain is home to a local ski hill operated by the Mount Cain Alpine Park Society.

The Mount Cain ski hill is run mostly by volunteers, many of whom work in the forest industry on North Vancouver Island. "Cain", as it is called for short, is known mostly for its back-country. The hill itself has two t-bars and a rope tow.

See also
List of mountains of Canada

References

External links
http://www.mountcain.com/

Ski areas and resorts in British Columbia

Cain, Mount
One-thousanders of British Columbia
Rupert Land District